The Charles T.H. Goode House at 1215 E. Main in American Fork, Utah was built in 1897.  It was listed on the National Register of Historic Places in 1987.

It was a home of Charles T.H. Goode, born 1847 in Wappenbury in
Warwickshire, England.

References

Houses completed in 1897
Houses on the National Register of Historic Places in Utah
Houses in Utah County, Utah
Buildings and structures in American Fork, Utah
National Register of Historic Places in Utah County, Utah